Micromonolepis pusilla, (Syn. Monolepis pusilla) is the only species of the genus Micromonolepis in the flowering plant family Amaranthaceae, known by the common names small povertyweed and red povertyweed. It is native to the Western United States, including the Great Basin and surrounding areas, where it grows in sandy scrub, dry valleys, playas, and other open habitat. It is a somewhat fleshy annual herb producing a branching, slender stem that has a mealy whitish texture when young and turns dull to bright red with age, losing its grainy coat. It grows up to 14 to 20 centimeters tall. The thick oblong leaves are up to a centimeter long. Clusters of 1 to 3 minute flowers appear in the leaf axils, each flower made up of 3 tiny sepals.

References

External links
Jepson Manual Treatment
USDA Plants Profile
Red Povertyweed in Wyoming
Photo gallery

Chenopodioideae
Amaranthaceae genera
Flora of the Western United States
Monotypic Caryophyllales genera